Barry Jhay (born Oluwakayode Junior Balogun) is a Nigerian Afrobeats musician notable for his cultural style of music. He is from Ibadan, Nigeria but raised in Lagos and his father is the late Fuji artist, Ayinde Barrister. Barry was born into a lineage of well-known Yoruba musicians as his  grandfather I.K. Dairo is a well known Juju traditional artist and father is credited for the invention of Fuji music.

Music and Career 
Barry Jhay entered the music scene in 2018 and was propelled into recognition with the success of his single tiled Aiye. The song captured a soulfully presented representation of some of the cyclical nature of life. Barry's music has explored profound themes such as the Yoruba concept of Ori and has conveyed other messages such as urging listeners to be more compassionate and to be courageous in the face of oppression and to examine evidence before passing judgment. His belief is that music is for ones soul and he has portrayed his intention to make music that has deeper meaning and is particularly his, as opposed to the result of his musical lineage.

Awards and nominations

Discography

Singles
Ashe She
Only you
Olodo
Sokale
Ori
Japa
Muje
Solemuje
Aiye
Best in the world

References 

Afrobeat musicians
The Headies winners
Living people
1993 births